Succinylmonocholine is an ester of succinic acid and choline created by the metabolism of suxamethonium chloride.

See also
 Succinic acid
 Choline

References

Choline esters
Carboxylic acids
Quaternary ammonium compounds